Alvin Douglas McKay (May 28, 1929 – May 11, 2020) was a Canadian professional ice hockey player. He played one playoff game in the National Hockey League with the Detroit Red Wings during the 1950 Stanley Cup Finals, helping Detroit win the Stanley Cup, though his name did not appear on the Cup. The rest of his career, which lasted from 1947 to 1957, was spent in various minor leagues. He also won the Calder Cup with the Indianapolis Capitals of the American Hockey League in 1950, along with teammate Gordon Haidy. McKay and Chris Hayes are the only NHL players to play their only game in the Stanley Cup Finals. McKay died in May 2020 at the age of 90.

Career statistics

Regular season and playoffs

See also
 List of players who played only one game in the NHL

References

 Total Hockey 2nd Edition, Dan Diamond; Scarbrough, Ont.

1929 births
2020 deaths
Canadian ice hockey coaches
Canadian ice hockey left wingers
Detroit Auto Club players
Detroit Bright's Goodyears players
Detroit Red Wings players
Ice hockey people from Ontario
Indianapolis Capitals players
New Jersey Devils coaches
Omaha Knights (USHL) players
Ontario Hockey Association Senior A League (1890–1979) players
Sportspeople from Hamilton, Ontario
Stanley Cup champions
Windsor Spitfires players